is a Japanese light novel series written by Yuka Tachibana and illustrated by Yasuyuki Syuri. It began serialization online in 2016 on the user-generated novel publishing website Shōsetsuka ni Narō. It was later acquired by Fujimi Shobo, which has published eight volumes since February 2017 under its Kadokawa Books imprint. A manga adaptation with art by Fujiazuki has been serialized online via Kadokawa Shoten's ComicWalker website since July 2017 and has been collected in eight tankōbon volumes. Both the light novel and manga have been licensed in North America by Seven Seas Entertainment. An anime television series adaptation by Diomedéa aired from April to June 2021. A second season is set to premiere in 2023.

Premise 
Sei Takanashi, an office worker, is returning home late at night but is summoned to the magic world of Salutania; the summoning, however, is a one way kidnapping with no way to send her home. 
Unfazed, Sei follows her own devices and sets her sights on being a researcher at the Medicinal Flora Research Institute, an establishment known for its studies regarding herbs and potions. While indulging in her latest passion, Sei has a fateful encounter with the commander of the Third Order of Knights. But little does she know, her aptitude as a Saint will continue to exert its influence over her new life.

Characters

A woman in her early 20's that worked in a corporate office. After arriving home very late one evening, she finds herself caught on a magic field then suddenly is sitting on a floor in a medieval-looking location next to a girl that appears to be in her mid to late teens. A red-headed man calling himself the crown prince calls the other woman their "Saint" and ignores Sei. She finds a purpose for herself after discovering the flower and herb garden outside the palace. She has a good knowledge of flowers and herbs and puts them to good use as a researcher at The Medicinal Flora Research Institute. The potions and food she makes are 1.5 times more effective than everyone else's. By just concentrating, she can visually translate the written native languages into Japanese. 
Her Saint powers are awakened by love; though it doesn't need to be romantic in nature.

Commander of the Third Order of the Knights of the Kingdom of Salutania. After Sei saves him with a high-quality healing potion that she made, he develops romantic feelings for her; though Sei in unaware. He is the third son of a Margrave. He can use ice magic, which is considered rare, to create protective ice walls.

He is the director of The Medicinal Flora Research Institute. He invites Sei to officially join them. Albert Hawke is an old friend of his. He suspects that Sei might be the true "Saint". His father is a Count.

The Grand Magus of the Kingdom of Salutania and the Director of the Royal Mage Academy. He is the one who summoned Sei and Aira. He used so much of his magic power for the summon that he had to sleep for quite a long time. By the time he wakes up, the misunderstanding the prince caused is over; ironic, as Yuri would have been able to identify the saint.

A green-haired man that appears to be about Sei's age. She first meets him in the flower and herb garden outside the palace. He is a researcher at The Medicinal Flora Research Institute. He is assigned to train Sei after she is accepted at the Institute. He teaches her how to make a basic potion and how magic is used in this world. 

The Deputy Director of the Royal Mage Academy. He does the first appraisal of Sei's enchantment ability and reports it to the king. He is one of Albert Hawke's older brothers.

A teen-aged noblewoman. She occasionally meets Sei in the palace library and they talk. She becomes a friend of Sei's and allows her to use her nickname of Liz. Elizabeth tells Sei that most of the women refer to Commander Hawke as the "Ice Knight" because he gives the daughters of the nobles the cold shoulder and can use ice magic. She is a daughter of a Marquis, the fiancée of the crown prince and a junior at the Royal Academy; the high school for the noble's children.
Liz originally thought poorly of Aira, unaware that Aira was ignorant to the customs of the kingdom; due to them being antiquated back on Earth.

A 16 year old girl that was summoned along with Sei. She is the one the crown prince declared was the "Saint" and he has been keeping her in tight control since her arrival; largely due to his promise to find a way home for her (after seeing Aira break down crying in despair that the summoning couldn't be reversed). She attended the Royal Academy as a senior while under the control of Prince Kyle. Unfortunately, Aira unintentionally causes trouble due to being unaware of the class system that wasn't present in her world; largely the prince's fault for not considering it. After graduating, she joined the Royal Mage Academy to further her studies of magic.

The crown prince of the Kingdom of Salutania. He is a senior at the Royal Academy. Due to his ignorance to the other world and it's customs, Kyle chose the beautiful young Aira as the saint and ignored Sei. He plotted to keep the kingdom from lashing back at Aira for his stupidity when Sei was confirmed as the real saint, which ultimately ended up pointless.

He is the second prince of the Kingdom of Salutania. He is a junior at the Royal Academy. He is also Prince Kyle's brother.

The king of Salutania, a highly aristocratic society where only the nobles have last names. He seems to be very sympathetic towards Sei.

 The Prime Minister of Salutania. He is convinced that Sei is the Saint, but he is concerned about the political fallout if the first prince is proven wrong.

The son of the Prime Minister along with being a close friend and classmate to the first prince. He expects to inherit his father's office.

A very experienced "alchemist" (potion maker) in charge of making potions for Klausner's Domain. She shows Sei the only known diary of a previous Saint to help her learn how to activate and use her "Saint's Magic".

A native of Klausner's Domain that is in charge of their local mercenary squad charged with controlling the monsters. He is very tall and muscular with a friendly attitude. He is not one well versed or used to using proper etiquette when speaking.

Media

Light novels
The series written by Yuka Tachibana began serialization online in 2016 on the user-generated novel publishing website Shōsetsuka ni Narō. It was later acquired by Fujimi Shobo, who have published it as a light novel with illustrations by Yasuyuki Syuri in eight volumes since February 2017 under their Kadokawa Books imprint. The light novel is licensed in North America by Seven Seas Entertainment.

Manga
A manga adaptation with art by Fujiazuki has been serialized online via Kadokawa Shoten's ComicWalker website since July 2017 and has been collected in eight tankōbon volumes. The manga is also licensed in North America by Seven Seas Entertainment. A spin-off manga series illustrated by Aoagu, titled The Saint's Magic Power Is Omnipotent: The Other Saint, began serialization on the ComicWalker site in October 2020. The spin-off manga is also licensed by Seven Seas Entertainment.

The Other Saint

Anime
On September 7, 2020, Kadokawa announced that the series would be receiving an anime adaptation. It was later revealed to be a television series animated by Diomedéa. The series is directed by Shōta Ihara, with Wataru Watari overseeing scripts, Masakazu Ishikawa designing the characters, Kenichi Kuroda composing the series' music, and Aira Yūki serving as music producer. The series aired from April 6 to June 22, 2021, on AT-X, Tokyo MX, MBS, and BS11.  Yūki also performed the opening theme song, "Blessing", while NOW ON AIR performed the ending theme song, "Page for Tomorrow". Funimation licensed the series outside of Asia. Following Sony's acquisition of Crunchyroll, the series was moved to Crunchyroll. On July 13, 2021, Funimation started streaming their English dub of the anime. Muse Communication has licensed the series in South and Southeast Asia and is streaming it on their Muse Asia YouTube channel.

On March 9, 2022, it was announced that the series will be receiving a second season. The main staff members are returning to reprise their roles. It is set to premiere in 2023.

Episode list

Reception 
Reviewing episode 1 of the anime, the reviewers at Anime News Network gave the series a mixed reviews, averaging 3 stars out of 5, criticizing the generic setting and rushed pace of the first episode, while praising the quality of the animation, and the potential for story development. The reviewers also noted that while the main character did not get much opportunity for character development in the first episode, her design as an older women in her twenties, instead of the more common teenage boy, is interesting.

See also
Sweet Reincarnation - A light novel series with the same illustrator
The "Hentai" Prince and the Stony Cat. - A light novel series by Sō Sagara, one of the script writers of the anime adaptation
Cherry Petals Fall Like Teardrops - A video game where Ō Jackson, who is one of the script writers of the anime adaptation, is one of the script writers. 
Navel - Ō Jackson is one of the founders of the company.

Notes

References

External links
  at Shōsetsuka ni Narō 
  
  
  
 

2017 Japanese novels
Anime and manga based on light novels
AT-X (TV network) original programming
Crunchyroll anime
Diomedéa
Fujimi Shobo
Isekai anime and manga
Isekai novels and light novels
Japanese webcomics
Kadokawa Dwango franchises
Kadokawa Shoten manga
Light novels
Light novels first published online
Muse Communication
Seven Seas Entertainment titles
Shōjo manga
Shōsetsuka ni Narō
Upcoming anime television series
Webcomics in print